Trumping may refer to:
 Ruff (cards), playing a trump card
 Flatulence, breaking wind

See also
 Trump (card games)